The following is a list of the 13 cantons of the Indre department, in France, following the French canton reorganisation which came into effect in March 2015:

 Ardentes
 Argenton-sur-Creuse
 Le Blanc
 Buzançais
 Châteauroux-1
 Châteauroux-2
 Châteauroux-3
 La Châtre
 Issoudun
 Levroux
 Neuvy-Saint-Sépulchre
 Saint-Gaultier
 Valençay

References